Mancusi is a surname. Notable people with the surname include:

Guido Mancusi (born 1966), Austrian-Italian conductor and composer
Mari Mancusi, American author
Ursula Mancusi Ungaro (born 1951), American judges

See also 
Mancusi v. DeForte, is a decision of the United States Supreme Court on privacy and the Fourth Amendment